In Gut's House is the second studio album by American no wave band Ut, released in 1987 by record label Blast First.

Reception 

Trouser Press called it "nearly as winning a balance of pop-conscious song-structuring and outright-croak as Sonic Youth's Evol-period".

The Wire included the reissue on their list of the top 50 albums of 2006.

Track listing

 Evangelist - 2:49
 I.D. - 5:14
 Swallow - 3:40
 Big Wing - 4:22
 Hotel - 4:37
 Homebled - 7:13
 Shut Fog - 5:38
 Mosquito Botticelli - 4:02
 Dirty Net - 1:21
 Landscape - 5:17

References

External links 

 

1987 albums
Ut (band) albums